Palpita gracialis, the gracile palpita moth, is a moth of the family Crambidae. It is found in North America, from California to Texas and Oklahoma.

The length of the forewings is 10-12.5 mm. Adults have translucent white wings with pearly iridescence. The costa is brown, with a large, dark grey reniform spot and smaller orbicular spots.

References

Moths described in 1886
Palpita
Moths of North America